Pierre Sanharib Issa (born 11 September 1975) is a South African former professional footballer who played as a defender. He is the current sporting director of the Greek side Olympiacos. Born in South Africa, Issa is of Lebanese descent.

Club career 
Born in Germiston, South Africa, Issa began playing for French semi-professional side Dunkerque.

He started his professional career with Marseille in 1995 and went on to play in the 1999 UEFA Cup Final.

He moved to Chelsea on loan in January 2001, although he did not play a competitive game for the London club.

He is best known in England for his spell with Watford in 2001–02. Signed by new manager Gianluca Vialli from Marseille, Issa scored once, against Portsmouth. Issa was memorably dropped by his stretcher bearers after an injury in a home game against Birmingham City, and was put on the club's transfer list on 14 February 2002, only five months after he had signed for the club. He never played for Watford again, but played for his country at 2002 FIFA World Cup whilst still contracted to Watford.

After leaving Watford, Issa signed for Olympic Beirut and won both Lebanese Premier League and Lebanese FA Cup in his first season with the club, but was released in the 2004–05 season as the club's ownership was changed due to financial considerations.

He signed for Ionikos of Greece and later for OFI Crete, also in Greece, where he stayed until 2009.

International career 
Issa played 47 times for South Africa since making his debut on 15 November 1997 against Germany, having also captained his country.

In the 1998 FIFA World Cup, during the opening match, he scored an own goals against France. Issa was also selected for the 2002 FIFA World Cup squad.

Honours 
Olympic Beirut
 Lebanese Premier League: 2003
 Lebanese FA Cup: 2003

Individual
 Lebanese Premier League Team of the Season: 2002–03

References 

1975 births
Living people
Sportspeople from Germiston
Association football defenders
White South African people
South African people of Lebanese descent
Sportspeople of Lebanese descent
South African soccer players
Lebanese footballers
South Africa international soccer players
South African expatriate soccer players
Olympique de Marseille players
Expatriate footballers in France
Expatriate footballers in England
Expatriate footballers in Greece
Watford F.C. players
Olympic Beirut players
Chelsea F.C. players
OFI Crete F.C. players
Ionikos F.C. players
1998 FIFA World Cup players
2002 FIFA World Cup players
2000 African Cup of Nations players
2002 African Cup of Nations players
2006 Africa Cup of Nations players
Ligue 1 players
Lebanese Premier League players
Super League Greece players
USL Dunkerque players